John "Jack" Perri (born 1975) is the head men's basketball coach at Southern New Hampshire University. He previously served as the head men's basketball coach for LIU Brooklyn from 2012 to 2017, and was the head coach at Rhode Island College from 2004 to 2005. Perri also has been an assistant coach at his alma mater Bentley and Boston University.

Perri grew up in Manalapan Township, New Jersey and scored 1,200 points playing basketball at Manalapan High School.

Head coaching record

References

1975 births
Living people
Basketball coaches from New Jersey
Basketball players from New Jersey
Bentley Falcons men's basketball coaches
Bentley Falcons men's basketball players
Boston University Terriers men's basketball coaches
College men's basketball head coaches in the United States
LIU Brooklyn Blackbirds men's basketball coaches
Manalapan High School alumni
People from Manalapan Township, New Jersey
Southern New Hampshire Penmen men's basketball coaches
Sportspeople from Monmouth County, New Jersey